The Aviation Research Centre (ARC) is India's imagery intelligence organisation, a part of the Directorate General of Security, run by the Research and Analysis Wing (R&AW). It started functioning in November 1962, in the wake of the Sino-Indian War, as an extension of the Intelligence Bureau, but placed under the Ministry of External Affairs. 

It was formally created on 7 September 1963, with R. N. Kao as Director and Acting Group Captain Lal Singh Grewal (later, Vice Chief of Indian Air Force) as Operations Manager at Charbatia air base (code named Oak Tree 1). It was later moved to the Prime Minister's Secretariat, and in February 1965, along with Special Frontier Force and Special Service Bureau (now Sashastra Seema Bal), was brought under the Directorate General of Security in the Cabinet Secretariat (this organisation was created in late 1964 with B. N. Mullick as DG, Security; the post was later shifted to the chief of R&AW upon its constitution in 1968). 

One of its most influential Directors was Prof H.B. Mohanti. ARC was initially a temporary and ad hoc organisation, but was made permanent in 1971. Over the years, ARC had grown into a large operation and flies a large and varied fleet that until recently included the high-flying Mach 3 capable Mikoyan-Gurevich MiG-25.

Inventory
The ARC began operations in 1962 with a Helio Twin Courier loaned from the USAF. ARC operated fixed-wing transport aircraft like Russian IL-76s and AN-32s. It also had General Dynamics Gulfstream III and Global 5000 jets. The helicopter inventory comprises Russian Mil Mi-17s and a mix of locally built Cheetahs (modified French Alouette IIs) and Chetaks (Alouette IIIs). The MIG-25 (also christened as Foxbat  by NATO) was used for high altitude reconnaissance until being decommissioned in 2006. ARC was also believed to be the first department to induct the indigenously built 'Pilotless Target Aircraft' (PTA) Lakshya. 

Lakshya is equipped with advanced support system to help it perform tactful aerial exploration in the battlefield, including target acquisition. The  Lakshya is fitted with a digitally controlled engine that can be operated from the ground using a remote. Lakshya had been designed by Aeronautical Development Establishment, Bangalore. Lakshya is a surface/ship launched high subsonic reusable aerial target system, remotely piloted from ground. It provides training to the gun and missile crew and to air defence pilots for weapon engagement.

Bases
According to a report from Globalsecurity.org, R&AW Aviation Research Centre operated bases at Charbatia Air Base in Choudwar, Cuttack district (largest base); Sarsawa Air Base near Saharanpur on the Uttar Pradesh-Haryana border; Dum Duma Air Base near Tinsukia in Assam; Palam Air Base in Delhi; and the Farkhor Air Base, the only Indian military airbase situated in a foreign country, at Farkhor/Ayni in Tajikistan.

In 2018 the Duma Duma Air Base was identified as one of 15 disused airfields that could be transferred to other public agencies. At the time it was being looked after by the Defense Estate Organization.

Function
Aerial surveillance, SIGINT operations, photo reconnaissance flights (PHOTINT), monitoring of borders, imagery intelligence (IMINT) were the main functions of the Aviation Research Centre (ARC). 

The aircraft were fitted with state-of-the-art electronic surveillance equipment and long range cameras capable of taking pictures of targets from very high altitudes. ARC also took the responsibility along with the IAF to transport Special Frontier Force (SFF) commandos from their trans-location at Sarsawa, 250 km north of New Delhi, though the SFF's own base is in Chakrata in Uttarakhand.

Project 596 

The United States supplied surveillance equipment to Aviation Research Centre to spy on China's nuclear programme and naval assets from 1962.

Kargil War
In 1999 during the Kargil War, after the Pakistani intrusion was detected, ARC was tasked to check if the Pakistanis had indeed crossed the Line of Control to the Indian side and violated the border agreement. A number of missions were flown by the ARC on request from the Indian Army and the PMO. 

Senior officials of the Indian armed forces including the Chief of Air Staff and Chief of Army staff highly commended the work done by ARC, quoting "The electronic and optical information provided by the ARC before and during the actual operations was of immense value to the conduct of air strikes." Also the K. Subrahmanyam committee report into the Kargil war observed that "No intelligence failures had been attributed on account of functioning of RAW and ARC. However, certain equipment inadequacies were highlighted such as satellite imagery and UAVs".

Controversies

ARC was blamed by many for its failure to monitor and detect the intrusion by Pakistan in Kargil. There had been even rumors about possible split of ARC from R&AW. Moreover, turf battles between the civilian and military intelligence agencies, which had intensified following feeble attempts to revamp the country's information gathering capabilities around 2001, led to difficulties in close cooperation or information sharing between R&AW and the Intelligence Bureau.

There had also been reports  of turf wars with the newly set up National Technical Research Organisation over airborne intelligence and satellite imagery. The manpower of ARC also got diminished when 330 technical posts, along with incumbents, were transferred to NTRO in 2006–07.

Proposal of Dissolution 
In 2012, the Naresh Chandra Committee on national security recommended merger of ARC with R&AW, in view of ARC's turf wars with NTRO and DIA. As a part of larger reforms, backed by NSA Ajit Doval, Aviation Research Centre (ARC) was proposed to be shut down in 2015 and ARC's assets were to be divided between the National Technical Research Organisation and the Indian Air Force. 

However, it was not carried out and the agency continues to exist.

Current status
Previously, ARC was part of the Directorate General of Security, along with three other organisations, viz., Special Service Bureau, Special Frontier Force and Chief Inspectorate of Armaments. Whereas R&AW is a wing of the Cabinet Secretariat, with secretariat-style rank structure at Headquarters (Secretary, Special Secretary, Additional Secretary etc.), DGS was an attached office. Secretary, R&AW, held, ex-officio, the post of Director General of Security. Below him was the Principal Director, of Special DG or Special Secretary rank. SSB and ARC had their respective Directors (Additional DG or Additional Secretary rank), SFF had an Inspector General (Major General rank) and CIOA had a Chief Inspector (Lieutenant Colonel rank). In January 2001, DGS was split and SSB and CIOA were shifted to the Ministry of Home Affairs. The post of Principal Director, DGS, was also moved alongside as Director General, SSB. Thereafter, the post of Director, ARC was upgraded as Special Secretary, ARC and Head of department, SFF, but he continued to report to DG (Security) (except in case of Arvind Saxena, who reported to the NSA).

Subsequently, in 2021, ARC was removed as a separate organisation from the second schedule of the Right to Information Act and included with R&AW as its technical wing.

See also

Research and Analysis Wing
Farkhor Air Base
Indian Air Force
National Technical Research Organisation
List of Indian Intelligence agencies
Intelligence Bureau (India)

Notes

References

External links

 Official website of The Indian Air Force
 Indian Air Force on bharat-rakshak.com
 ARC's early days

Indian intelligence agencies
Information sensitivity
Research and Analysis Wing
1962 establishments in India
2015 disestablishments in India
Government agencies established in 1962
Government agencies disestablished in 2015